The South African type MX tender was a steam locomotive tender.

Type MX tenders entered service in 1949, as tenders to the last batch of Class 19D  Mountain type steam locomotives which entered service on the South African Railways in that year.

Manufacturer
Type MX tenders were built in 1948 by North British Locomotive Company.

The South African Railways (SAR) placed its final batch of fifty Class 19D locomotives in service in 1949, built by North British. The new Type MX tender for these engines was designed by Dr. M.M. Loubser, Chief Mechanical Engineer of the SAR from 1939 to 1949.

Characteristics

It was a tank wagon type tender with a cylindrical water tank, similar in appearance to the North American Vanderbilt type tenders, and was the first of its kind on the SAR. It rode on three-axle Buckeye bogies to reduce the axle load and became commonly known as a Torpedo tender.

Locomotive

Only the last batch of fifty Class 19D locomotives were delivered new with Type MX tenders, which were numbered in the range from 3321 to 3370 for their engines. An oval number plate, bearing the engine number and tender type, was attached to the rear end of the tenders.

Classification letters
Since many tender types are interchangeable between different locomotive classes and types, a tender classification system was adopted by the SAR. The first letter of the tender type indicates the classes of engines to which it could be coupled. The "M_" tenders could be used with the locomotive classes as shown, although in some cases engine drawbars and intermediate emergency chains had to be replaced or adjusted to suit the target locomotive.
 Class 12, Class 12A and Class 12B.
 Class 14, Class 14A and Class 14B.
 Class 15 and Class 15A.
 Class 16, Class 16A, Class 16B and Class 16C.
 Class 19, Class 19A, Class 19B, Class 19C and Class 19D.
 Class 20.
 Class 24.
 Class MC1, Class MH and Class MJ.
 Class S2.

The second letter indicates the tender's water capacity.

Illustration

References

MX